MCOC may refer to:

Maharashtra Control of Organised Crime Act, a law in India
 Marvel Contest of Champions, a video game for Android and iOS